is a private university in Mitaka, Tokyo, Japan. The predecessor of the school was founded 1909 in Kumamoto, Kumamoto. It was chartered as a university in 1964. The present name was adopted in 1996.

External links
 Official website

Educational institutions established in 1909
Christian universities and colleges in Japan
Private universities and colleges in Japan
Universities and colleges in Tokyo
1909 establishments in Japan
Mitaka, Tokyo
Seminaries and theological colleges in Japan